Yunes (also Romanized as Yūnes, Yoones, and Yūnos; also known as Yūnus) is a village in Samen Rural District, Samen District, Malayer County, Hamadan Province, Iran. At the 2006 census, its population was 370, in 119 families.

References 

Populated places in Malayer County